The Atlantic Collection is a 1996 compilation album by Hall & Oates.  While their 1977 compilation No Goodbyes was a collection of Hall & Oates' Atlantic Records recordings, this collection provides a more complete picture of that phase of Hall & Oates' history.  This album contains the previously unreleased (but often bootlegged) track "Past Times Behind." It also has two rare songs "It's Uncanny" and "I Want to Know You for a Long Time," that were only released on the No Goodbyes album.

Track listing
"Goodnight and Goodmorning" (Hall, Oates) - 3:18
"I'm Sorry" (Hall, Oates) - 3:06
"Fall in Philadelphia" (Hall) - 4:00
"Waterwheel" (Hall) - 3:55
"Lilly (Are You Happy)" (Hall, Oates) - 4:12
"Past Times Behind" (Oates) - 3:07  (Previously unreleased)
"When the Morning Comes"  (Hall) - 3:13
"Had I Known You Better Then" (Oates) - 3:25
"Las Vegas Turnaround (The Stewardess Song)" (Oates) - 2:58
"She's Gone" (Hall, Oates) - 5:16
"I'm Just a Kid (Don't Make Me Feel Like a Man)" (Oates) - 3:19
"Abandoned Luncheonette" (Hall) - 3:56
"Lady Rain" (Hall, Oates) - 4:26
"Laughing Boy" (Hall) - 3:30
"It's Uncanny" (Hall) - 3:43
"I Want to Know You for a Long Time" (Hall) - 3:20
"Can't Stop the Music (He Played It Much Too Long)" (Oates) - 2:48
"Is It a Star" (Hall, Oates) - 4:47
"Beanie G and the Rose Tattoo" (Hall) - 3:02
"You're Much Too Soon" (Hall) - 4:09
"70's Scenario" (Hall) - 4:02

References

Hall & Oates compilation albums
1996 compilation albums